Koné (KOH-nay), also spelt Kone, is a surname found mostly in North and West Africa, in particular Mali, Mauritania, Morocco, Burkina Faso, Côte d'Ivoire, and  Guinea.

Historically, the name Koné is a clan name (or patronym) of the Mandinka and closely-related Bambara peoples. It is related to another clan name, Jara/Diarra,  and is heard in many of the chronicles that have been handed down orally.  Both are frequently praised together in song, signifying bravery and fearlessness.

Today, the name is found mostly in Mali, Mauritania, Burkina Faso, Côte d'Ivoire, Guinea, and France (a hangover from the French colonial empire in that region) but has also spread to North America. It is also used as a given name.

Other derivations
There is also a similar German name, Köne, originating in the Old Germanic name Kuonrat (kōniz, meaning able, clever, and rēdaz, meaning help, advise.

The Indian name Kone derives from the caste name Konar. The caste name is interchangeable with the names "Konar" and "Kovalar", being derived from Tamil word Kōn, which can mean "king" and "herdsmen".

People with the name

Surname, West African origin 
Aboubacar Kone (born 28 March 2001), Ivorian-born Belgian footballer 
Aboubakar Koné (disambiguation), several people
Adama Koné (born 1987), Ivorian footballer
Aguibou Koné, candidate in the 2013 Malian presidential election 
Alimata Koné (born 1965), Ivorian female sprinter
Amadou Koné, Ivorian writer 
Antoine Koné (1963–2019), Ivorian Roman Catholic prelate
Arouna Koné (born 1983), Ivorian footballer
Babani Koné (aka Fatoumata; born 1968), Malian composer and singer 
Bakare Kone (born 1989), Ivorian footballer 
Bakari Koné (born 1981), Ivorian footballer
Bakary Koné (born 1988), Burkinabé footballer
Begnon-Damien Koné (1921–1986), Burkinabé politician who served in the French Senate from 1958 to 1959 
Ben Lhassine Kone (born 2000), Ivorian  footballe
Boubacar Koné (born Aboubacar Sidiki Koné, 1984), Malian footballer
Brahima Bruno Koné (born 1995), Ivorian  footballer
Cheick Oumar Koné (born c.1956), Malian football coach
Diané Mariam Koné (born 1953), Malian politician 
Djakaridja Koné (born 1986), Burkinabé footballer
Dramane Koné (born 1982), Burkinabé drummer and griot
Drissa Kone (born 1960), Malian djembe master drummer 
Emmanuel Koné (born 1986), Ivorian footballer
Famoussa Koné (born 1994), Malian footballer
Fatoumata Koné (born 1988) is an Ivorian female basketball player, national team 2013
Francis Koné (born 1990), Ivorian footballer, played for Togo
Gaoussou Koné(born1944), Ivorian sprinter
Gogbeu Francis Koné (born 1991), Ivorian sprinter 
Hamed Koné (born 1987), Ivorian footballer 
Ibrahim or Ibrahima Koné, several people
Isaac Koné (born 1991), Ivorian footballer
Ismael Koné (disambiguation), several people
Kafougouna Koné (1944–2017), Malian politician, diplomat and military officer
Kassim Koné (born 1986), Ivorian footballer
Kinapeya Kone (born  1979), Ivorian judoka
Kouadio Koné (born 2001), French professional footballer
Koro Issa Ahmed Koné (born 1989), Ivorian footballer
Lamine Koné (born 1989), Ivorian footballer
Lanciné Koné (born 1979), Ivorian footballer
Lompolo Koné (1921–1974), Burkinabé playwright, editor, and diplomat
Malamine Koné (born 1971), Malian and French entrepreneur
Mamadou Koné (born 1991), Ivorian professional footballer
Mamina Koné (born 1988), Ivorian female taekwondo athlet
Mariam Koné (born 1987), Malian singer, member of Les Amazones d'Afrique
Mariatou Koné, Ivorian academic 
Mbah Koné (born 1990), Burkinabé  footballer
Mohamed Koné (disambiguation), several people
Mory Koné (born 1994), French footballer 
Moussa Koné (disambiguation), several people
Oumar Koné (disambiguation), several people
 Oumou Kone (born 1999), female Malian footballer
Ousmane Kone (born 1952), Malian politician 
Salif Koné, Malian sprinter
Salimata Koné (born 1990), Malian footballer, played for the women's national team 2014 
Samba Koné (born 2002), Malian footballer
 Seydou Koné (disambiguation), several people
Sidy Koné (born 1992), also known as Sidi Koné, Malian footballer
Sika Koné (born 2002), Malian basketball player
Soufiane Koné (born 1980), French footballer
Souleymane Kone (born 1996), Ivorian footballer
Tiassé Koné (born 1981), former Ivorian international footballer
Tiémoko Meyliet Koné (born 1949), Ivorian economist and politician, vice-president of Ivory Coast 2022
Youssouf Koné (disambiguation), several people
Yssouf Koné (born 1982), Burkinabé footballer
Zoumana Koné (born 1991), Ivorian footballer

Other surnames
Bruce C. Kone (born 1958 in Germany), American nephrologist and molecular biologist
James Kone (also spelt Kon) (born 1987), South Sudanese footballer
Maveeran Alagumuthu Kone (1710–1759), Indian polygar who revolted against the British presence in India
Panagiotis Kone (born Gjergji Kone in Albania, 1987), Greek former footballer

Given name
Adama Koné Clofie (born 1967), Ivorian footballer

See also
Julius Kipyegon Kones (born 1972), Kenyan statistician and politician
Kipkalya Kones (1952–2008), Kenyan politician 
Kone (disambiguation)
Trent Kone-Doherty (born 2006), Irish footballer

References